Edwin W. Blomquist (October 30, 1896 – July 6, 1963) was an American railroad locomotive engineer, labor activist, and politician.

Early life and education 
Born in Chicago, Illinois, Blomquist moved with his family to Sweden in 1900 before returning to the United States in 1914, living in Madison, Wisconsin. He took courses at La Salle Extension University.

Career 
Blomquist worked as a locomotive engineer for the Chicago and North Western Transportation Company. He was also active in the Brotherhood of Locomotive Firemen and Enginemen. Blomquist lived in Adams, Wisconsin and served on the Adams Common Council and as mayor from 1927 to 1939. From 1935 to 1939, Blomquist served in the Wisconsin State Assembly as a Progressive. In 1946, Blomquist helped organized the Democratic Party in Adams County, Wisconsin and served as county chairman.

Death 
Blomquist died in a hospital in Adams, Wisconsin on July 6, 1963.

Notes

1896 births
1963 deaths
Politicians from Chicago
People from Adams County, Wisconsin
La Salle Extension University alumni
Wisconsin Progressives (1924)
Wisconsin city council members
Mayors of places in Wisconsin
Democratic Party members of the Wisconsin State Assembly
20th-century American politicians
Politicians from Madison, Wisconsin
American expatriates in Sweden